Bossoroca is a municipality of the western part of the state of Rio Grande do Sul, Brazil. The population is 6,205 (2020 est.) in an area of 1610.57 km². The name comes from the Guarani language, and may mean erosion.  It is located 524 km west of the state capital of Porto Alegre, northeast of Alegrete.

Bounding municipalities

São Luiz Gonzaga
São Miguel das Missões
Capão do Cipó
Santiago
Itacurubi
Santo Antônio das Missões

History

The area was first inhabited by the Guarani tribes. In the 17th and 18th centuries, Jesuit missions were established in the area. The municipality of Bossoroca was created on March 4, 1967.

References

External links
https://web.archive.org/web/20070930200958/http://www.citybrazil.com.br/rs/bossoroca/ 

Municipalities in Rio Grande do Sul